Diego "Diegui" Johannesson Pando (born 3 October 1993) is an Icelandic professional footballer who plays as a right-back for Albacete Balompié.

Club career
Born in Villaviciosa, Asturias to an Icelandic father and a Spanish mother, Johannesson joined Real Oviedo's youth setup in the 2011 summer, after spells at SD Llano 2000 and Sporting de Gijón. He made his debuts as a senior with the reserves in 2012, in Tercera División.

Initially a right winger, Johannesson was converted to a right back during the 2013–14 season. On 3 September 2014, he made his first team debut, starting in a 4–0 Copa del Rey home routing of SD Amorebieta.

Johannesson appeared in 13 first team matches during the campaign, as his side was promoted as champions. He made his professional debut on 25 October 2015, coming on as a second-half substitute for José Manuel Fernández in a 2–4 Segunda División away loss against SD Ponferradina.

On 4 July 2017, after already becoming a full-time member of the first team squad, Johannesson renewed his contract until 2019. A regular starter in the following two campaigns, he lost his first-choice status after the arrival of Juanjo Nieto in 2019.

On 10 January 2020, Johannesson went on loan to FC Cartagena for the remainder of the season. He helped the team in their promotion to the second division before returning to Oviedo, where he was again a backup option.

On 14 June 2021, Johannesson signed a two-year contract with Albacete Balompié, freshly relegated to Primera División RFEF.

International career
On 10 December 2014, Johannesson committed himself to Iceland, after stating that he would "dream of playing with its national team". On 25 January 2016, he received his first call up, being included in Lars Lagerbäck and Heimir Hallgrímsson's squad for a friendly against the United States.

Johannesson made his full international debut on 31 January 2016, replacing Guðmundur Þórarinsson at half-time in a 2–3 loss at the StubHub Center in Carson, California.

Honours
Segunda División B: 2014–15

References

External links

1993 births
Living people
People from Villaviciosa, Asturias
Association football defenders
Diego Johannesson
Diego Johannesson
Spanish footballers
Diego Johannesson
Diego Johannesson
Footballers from Asturias
Segunda División players
Segunda División B players
Tercera División players
Real Oviedo Vetusta players
Real Oviedo players
FC Cartagena footballers
Albacete Balompié players